Randwick Park is an eastern residential suburb of the city of Auckland, New Zealand. 

The suburb had high unemployment and high crime rates in the early 2000s, but after a liquor store owner was killed in 2008, a residents' association was formed to improve local sports and community facilities, with support from the Manurewa Local Board and Auckland Council's Southern Initiative program. It was named the Mitre10 Community of the Year in 2017.

Demographics

Randwick Park had a population of 6,150 at the 2018 New Zealand census, an increase of 375 people (6.5%) since the 2013 census, and an increase of 597 people (10.8%) since the 2006 census. There were 1,518 households, comprising 3,057 males and 3,096 females, giving a sex ratio of 0.99 males per female, with 1,788 people (29.1%) aged under 15 years, 1,638 (26.6%) aged 15 to 29, 2,454 (39.9%) aged 30 to 64, and 270 (4.4%) aged 65 or older.

Ethnicities were 21.1% European/Pākehā, 27.8% Māori, 37.7% Pacific peoples, 28.4% Asian, and 3.4% other ethnicities. People may identify with more than one ethnicity.

The percentage of people born overseas was 38.4, compared with 27.1% nationally.

Although some people chose not to answer the census's question about religious affiliation, 27.1% had no religion, 44.5% were Christian, 3.1% had Māori religious beliefs, 9.7% were Hindu, 2.2% were Muslim, 1.8% were Buddhist and 6.7% had other religions.

Of those at least 15 years old, 561 (12.9%) people had a bachelor's or higher degree, and 897 (20.6%) people had no formal qualifications. 348 people (8.0%) earned over $70,000 compared to 17.2% nationally. The employment status of those at least 15 was that 2,286 (52.4%) people were employed full-time, 465 (10.7%) were part-time, and 336 (7.7%) were unemployed.

Education
About half the students have Pacific heritage, and over a fifth are Māori. Some classes are taught in the Māori language.

The school teaches primarily in the Māori language.

Both these schools are coeducational. Rolls are as of

References

Suburbs of Auckland